Kevin Calia (born 9 September 1994) is an Italian motorcycle racer. He currently competes the CIV Superbike Championship, aboard a Suzuki GSX-R1000. He competed in the Red Bull MotoGP Rookies Cup, the Italian 125GP championship and the Italian Moto3 championship, where he was champion in 2012.

Career statistics

Grand Prix motorcycle racing

By season

Races by year
(key)

References

External links

Italian motorcycle racers
Living people
1994 births
125cc World Championship riders
Moto3 World Championship riders
People from Castel San Pietro Terme
FIM Superstock 1000 Cup riders
Sportspeople from the Metropolitan City of Bologna